The 1933 Wichita Shockers football team was an American football team that represented Wichita University (now known as Wichita State University) as a member of the Central Intercollegiate Conference (CIC) during the 1933 college football season. In its fourth season under head coach Al Gebert, the team compiled an 8–2 record.

Schedule

References

Wichita
Wichita State Shockers football seasons
Wichita Shockers football